Breslau is a community located within the township of Woolwich, part of the Waterloo Regional Municipality in Ontario Canada. Separated from the city of Kitchener by the Grand River, Breslau is named after the former German city of Breslau, now Wrocław, capital of Poland's Lower Silesia.

It is located at the junction of Highway 7 and Waterloo Regional Road 17. This routing, although recently bypassed, is the main route between Kitchener and the nearby Region of Waterloo International Airport, located south of the settled area. It is also close to the city of Guelph.

History 
The first settlers to the area now called Breslau arrived in 1806, mostly German Mennonite families from Pennsylvania. Settlers included John Brech, Daniel Erb and John Cressman. In the 1820s, members of the Cressman Mennonite Church began congregating in the homes of the early settlers. in 1834, the first meeting house in Waterloo County (built by Benjamin Eby in 1813) was donated to the Breslau congregation and moved to the settlement. In 1850, Joseph Erb built a dam, a sawmill and a grist mill. The village was named after Breslau, the capital city of the Province of Silesia in the former German Empire (now in southwestern Poland).

A post office was established in 1857 and began receiving mail on a daily basis. By 1864, the settlement had several tradesmen including two blacksmiths, a cooper, wagon maker, a cabinet maker and two mills.

Demographics 

Notable people
 Tubby Schmalz (1916–1981), Canadian ice hockey administrator, first commissioner of the Ontario Major Junior Hockey League

References

External links
 Town site

Breslau
Woolwich, Ontario
Designated places in Ontario